Remetea may refer to several places in Romania:

 Remetea, Bihor, a commune in Bihor County
 Remetea, Harghita, a commune in Harghita County
 Remetea, a village in Meteș Commune, Alba County
 Remetea, a district in the city of Târgu Mureș, Mureș County

See also
 Remetea Chioarului, a commune in Maramureș County
 Remetea Mare, a commune in Timiș County
 Remetea-Pogănici, a village in Fârliug Commune, Caraş-Severin County
 Remetea Oaşului, a village in Orașu Nou Commune, Satu Mare County
 Remetea-Luncă, a village in Mănăștiur Commune, Timiș County
 Remetea Mică, a village in Mașloc Commune, Timiș County